Sakhob Juraev  (: born 19 January 1987), is an Uzbekistani professional football player who currently plays for Olmaliq FK in the Uzbek League. He usually plays as a left-back.

Career
Juraev began his career at Lokomotiv Tashkent where he played in 2005–2007. He played in 2008–2014 for Bunyodkor. In 2014, he moved back to Lokomotiv Tashkent and played four matches in League. In February 2015 he signed a contract with Olmaliq FK.

International career
He made his debut on 11 February 2009 in the match against Bahrain, which Uzbekistan lost 0–1. Since that Juraev has appeared in 23 matches for Uzbekistan. He was also the member of the team in Asian Cup 2011, where Uzbekistan gained 4th place.

Honours

Club
Bunyodkor
Uzbek League (5): 2008, 2009, 2010, 2011, 2013
Uzbek Cup (4): 2008, 2010, 2012, 2013

Lokomotiv
Uzbek League runners-up (1): 2014

International
AFC Asian Cup 4th: 2011

References

External links
Sakhob Juraev- Goal.com 

1987 births
Living people
Uzbekistani footballers
Uzbekistan international footballers
FC Bunyodkor players
FC AGMK players
2011 AFC Asian Cup players
Association football fullbacks